Branislav Ľupták (born 5 June 1991) is a Slovak professional footballer who currently plays for MFK Dukla Banská Bystrica, competing in the Fortuna Liga.

Career
He made his debut for Dukla Banská Bystrica against Nitra on 16 July 2011.

On 3 July 2019 Ľupták signed a contract with Romanian Liga II side Gloria Buzău. He left the club after a single season.

References

External links
FK Dukla profile

1991 births
Living people
Sportspeople from Krupina
Slovak footballers
Slovak expatriate footballers
Slovakia under-21 international footballers
Association football midfielders
FK Dukla Banská Bystrica players
FC DAC 1904 Dunajská Streda players
MFK Ružomberok players
FC ViOn Zlaté Moravce players
FC Gloria Buzău players
Slovak Super Liga players
Liga II players
4. Liga (Slovakia) players
Slovak expatriate sportspeople in Romania
Expatriate footballers in Romania